Orfeas, Ορφέας, is the Greek for Orpheus, a legendary figure in Greek mythology, chief among poets and musicians.

Orfeas may refer to:

Football clubs

 Orfeas Nicosia, a Cypriot football club
 Orfeas Elefteroupoli F.C., a Greek football club
 A.P.O. Orfeas, a Greek football club

People

 Orfeas Tzanetopoulos, 1967–74 mayor of Egaleo, Greece

Miscellaneous

 Orfeas, a former Greek municipal unit
 Orfeas (album), 2011 album retelling the Orpheus legend

See also
 Orpheus (disambiguation), the English and German spelling
 Orphée (disambiguation), the French spelling
 Orfeo (disambiguation), the Italian spelling
 Orfeu (disambiguation), the Portuguese spelling
 Orfey (disambiguation), Орфей, the Russian spelling